Dactylic metre is any meter primarily composed of dactyls (long-short-short, or stressed-unstressed-unstressed). It may refer to:

 Dactylic tetrameter
 Dactylic pentameter
 Dactylic hexameter